Mouza Talib is a village in District Chiniot on Chak Jhumra road, Punjab, Pakistan. It is in Tehsil Chiniot's Union Council # 13 and is 8-km away from the Faisalabad to Pindi Bhattian Motorway M3 Sahianwala Interchange. Its Latitude is 31° 41' 28.08"N, and Longitude is 73° 0' 59.49"E. The people of Talib use M3 to commute as it is 140 kilometers away from Lahore and 30 kilometers away from Faisalabad.
Nearby towns are Chak Jhumra, Chiniot, Sargodha, Lalian, Bhawana, Rabwah (Chenab Nagar), Faisalabad and Pindi Bhattian. By road, Talib is connected to Barnala, Chak Jhumra, and Chiniot.
The most famous things in Talib are Darbar Baba gard Ali, Canal Bridge, Government Primary school for Boys Girls and Government Middle school for girls.

Before 1947

Mouza Talib' was inhabited by two young men from the Khokhar clan during Raja Ranjit Singh's rule over Punjab, they got married in a nearby locality and the population rose in the following years. Before the independence of Pakistan in 1947 era when India was a British colony Hindu Khatri were also living in the village and most of them were land lords with control over business and agriculture, and their terms with the Muslim community were not good, for instance, Muslims had to slaughter cows or bulls on their marriages by ensuring Hindus were out of sight to avoid any possible fight.

Independence of 1947

On 14–15 August 1947, Pakistan and India came into being respectively. Those Hindu Khatris migrated to India, leaving behind their property both (residential and agricultural) and it went into the hands of local Muslims, mainly Khokha's and Harals. The Government of Pakistan asked them to leave this village in advance for the migrants they were expecting to pound in from India, and offered them to possess a newly allocated village, Khichian, near Brnala, but they declined to do so and consequently had to leave agricultural lands for the migrants, mainly Gujjars and Arain.
By this time the previous offer by the Government for a new village also lapsed. So the locals once again became dependent.

After 1947

The immigrants and locals could not be adjusted on the go and developed some sort of enmity because of clashes in customs, language and wealth level, but the locals went on working hard in the later years, while others mainly Gujjars were enjoying the pleasures of life; this slowly but steadily changed the ultimate uphold of lands in favour of locals.

Castes
This village consists of four major families
 Khokhar
 Gujjar,
  Haral, and
 Arain 
other supporting castes include

 Kumar
 Nai
 Tarkhan
 Muslim Shaikh
 Lohar
  Machi
 Awan 
  Aasi
 Changur
  Miraci
  Badher 
 Tarrar

Facilities
This multi-ethnic population numbers near 7000  and much of this population is illiterate, and conditions of public facilities are poor. A Civil hospital exists three kilometers away from the main population area. Water sanitation and drainage are the burning issues these days.

Economy
The economy is meager and agricultural mostly. Some people are Government employees. A canal from Jhang Branch passes through the village. Irrigation water for land comes from this canal, also the land is very fertile. Some people go to Faisalabad, Lahore and Karachi for earning wages.

Professions
 Farming 
 Government Employment
 Trading (milk, charra, animals)
 In service sector (bankers, electricians)
 Manufacturing sector (rice mill employees, textile mill employees)
 Artisans (wood carvers, tailors)
 others

See also
 Chiniot
 Chiniot District
 Chiniotis
 Chiniot Tehsil

References
 map
 a local old man (Bahli, age 90 years) for most of the information

Villages in Chiniot District